Barry Baltus (born 3 May 2004) is a Belgian Grand Prix motorcycle racer.

Career

Moto3 World Championship
Baltus contested the  season as a full-time rider in the Moto3 World Championship for CarXpert Prüstel GP, despite missing the opening race of the season due to him being under the age limit.

Moto2 World Championship
In 2021, Baltus moved to the Moto2 class with NTS RW Racing GP. A free practice crash at the opening round in Qatar resulted in a wrist injury which delayed his race debut until the fifth round in France. A difficult season on the uncompetitive NTS machinery resulted in just one points finish for Baltus, ultimately finishing the season with just 2 points and in 32nd position of the rider's championship. 2022 was a significant improvement, as RW Racing switched to Kalex chassis, and B.Baltus scored 30 points (finishing twice in top 10), gaining experience in Moto2 class.

Career statistics

European Talent Cup

Races by year
(key) (Races in bold indicate pole position; races in italics indicate fastest lap)

Red Bull MotoGP Rookies Cup

Races by year
(key) (Races in bold indicate pole position; races in italics indicate fastest lap)

Grand Prix motorcycle racing

By season

By class

Races by year
(key) (Races in bold indicate pole position; races in italics indicate fastest lap)

 Half points awarded as less than two thirds of the race distance (but at least three full laps) was completed.

References

External links

2004 births
Living people
Sportspeople from Namur (city)
Belgian motorcycle racers
Moto3 World Championship riders
Moto2 World Championship riders